Rudy Ronaldo Barrientos Reyes (born 1 March 1999) is a Guatemalan footballer who plays as a midfielder for Liga Nacional club Municipal and the Guatemala national team.

Club career
A former academy player of Deportivo Zacapa, Barrientos joined Guastatoya in 2015. He made his senior debut for the club on 26 February 2017 in a goalless draw against Malacateco.

In June 2019, Barrientos joined Municipal. He was under a training contract with Guastatoya at that time and the signing was made without their knowledge. Guastatoya later sued both Municipal and Barrientos in National Football Federation of Guatemala.

International career
Barrientos is a former Guatemalan youth international. He was captain of national under-20 team at 2018 CONCACAF U-20 Championship. He was also part of under-23 team at 2019 Toulon Tournament.

Barrientos made his senior team debut for Guatemala on 17 November 2019 in a 5–0 CONCACAF Nations League win against Puerto Rico. He scored his first international goal four days later in a 8–0 friendly win against Antigua and Barbuda.

Honours
Guastatoya
Liga Nacional de Guatemala: Clausura 2018, Apertura 2018

Municipal
Liga Nacional de Guatemala: Apertura 2019

Career statistics

Club

International

International goals
As of 4 June 2021. Scores and results list Guatemala's goal tally first. Score column indicates score after each Barrientos goal.

References

External links
 

1999 births
Living people
Association football midfielders
Guatemalan footballers
Guatemala international footballers
Liga Nacional de Fútbol de Guatemala players
C.D. Guastatoya players
C.S.D. Municipal players
People from Izabal Department